Proselotis strictula is a moth of the family Gelechiidae. It was described by Edward Meyrick in 1937. It is found in South Africa, where it has been recorded from the Eastern Cape.

References

Endemic moths of South Africa
Moths described in 1937
Proselotis